The 2000 Southampton Council election took place on 4 May 2000 to elect members of Southampton Unitary Council in Hampshire, England. One third of the council was up for election and the Labour Party lost overall control of the council to no overall control.

After the election, the composition of the council was:
Labour 22
Liberal Democrat 16
Conservative 7

Election result
The results saw Labour lose their majority on the council for the first time in 13 years after both the Conservatives and Liberal Democrats made gains. The Conservatives gained the seats of Harefield, Shirley and St Lukes from Labour, with the winner in St Lukes, Stephen Day, becoming the youngest councillor at the age of 22. Among the defeated Labour councillors was the former leader of the council, Richard Bates, in Shirley, while the then leader of the council June Bridle only held her seat in Sholing by 59 votes. Meanwhile, the Liberal Democrats gained in Coxford and Woolston, the latter by 33 votes over Labour. The overall turnout in the election was 25%, with the lowest being 17.2% in Bargate ward.

Ward results

References

2000 English local elections
2000
2000s in Southampton